Chris Ash (born December 24, 1973) is an American football coach who is the defensive backs coach for the Las Vegas Raiders of the National Football League (NFL). He previously served as the safeties coach for the Jacksonville Jaguars in 2021.

A coaching veteran of 24 years, Ash previously served as the head coach at Rutgers University from 2016 to 2019 and also served as an assistant coach at the University of Texas at Austin, Ohio State University, University of Arkansas, University of Wisconsin–Madison, Iowa State University, San Diego State University and Drake University.

Early years
Ash played college football at Drake University as a safety on the football team and earned his bachelor’s degree from Drake. In 2005, Ash received his master's degree from Iowa State University.

Coaching career

Early career
Ash held assistant coaching positions with the Drake Bulldogs, Princeton Tigers, Iowa State Cyclones, and San Diego State Aztecs, before being hired by the Wisconsin Badgers in 2010.

Arkansas
In 2012, Ash joined as the defensive coordinator at the University of Arkansas, following former Badgers head coach Bret Bielema who was hired in the same capacity at Arkansas.

Ohio State
In January 2014, Ash was hired as the co-defensive coordinator and secondary coach for the Ohio State Buckeyes.

Rutgers
On December 7, 2015, Ash agreed to a 5-year, $11 million-guaranteed contract to become the head coach at Rutgers. He was fired as Rutgers head coach on September 29, 2019 due to poor performance.

Texas
Ash spent the rest of the 2019 season as an analyst at the University of Texas at Austin.

On December 15, 2019, Ash was hired as the defensive coordinator at Texas there he spent the 2020 season.

Jacksonville Jaguars
On February 11, 2021, Ash was hired by the Jacksonville Jaguars as their defensive backs and safeties coach under head coach Urban Meyer.

Las Vegas Raiders
On February 6, 2022, Ash was hired by the Las Vegas Raiders as their defensive backs coach under head coach Josh McDaniels.

Head coaching record

College

* Ash was fired mid-season on September 29, 2019.

Personal life
A native of Ottumwa, Iowa, Ash is married to his wife, Doreen. They have four children: Tanner, Jacey, Brady and Alexis.

References

External links
 Las Vegas Raiders profile

1973 births
Living people
American football safeties
Arkansas Razorbacks football coaches
Drake Bulldogs football coaches
Drake Bulldogs football players
Iowa State Cyclones football coaches
Jacksonville Jaguars coaches
Las Vegas Raiders coaches
Ohio State Buckeyes football coaches
Rutgers Scarlet Knights football coaches
San Diego State Aztecs football coaches
Texas Longhorns football coaches
Wisconsin Badgers football coaches
Iowa State University alumni
Sportspeople from Des Moines, Iowa
Players of American football from Iowa